Wuhan Derbies (simplified Chinese: 武汉德比; pinyin: Wǔhàn Débǐ) refers to various local derbies between the football teams of Wuhan. The term specifically refers to individual matches between the teams, but can also be used to describe the general rivalry between the different clubs.

Clubs 
As of 2023 season, there are four clubs in the Chinese Super League, China League One and China League Two that play in Wuhan:
 Wuhan Three Towns F.C. (Super League)
 Wuhan Jiangcheng F.C. (League Two)
 Hubei Istar F.C. (League Two)
Former clubs in the highest league include Wuhan Optics Valley F.C. (Jia-A 1998–1999, CSL 2005–2008), Wuhan Yangtze River F.C. (CSL 2013, 2019–2022). Vanguard Wuhan were formerly in the second-tier league.

Result

Statistics as of 8 July 2022.

References

China football rivalries
Sport in Wuhan
Football in China